Extreme Volume II Live is the second live album by Racer X, released by Shrapnel Records. Although it succeeds the release of Extreme Volume Live by four years, the songs on the album were actually recorded at the same time. At the time of the album's release, Racer X was on hiatus.

Track listing
All songs written by Paul Gilbert and Jeff Martin except where noted.

"Hammer Away" – 4:10
"Poison Eyes" – 4:04
"Heart of a Lion" (K.K. Downing, Rob Halford, Glenn Tipton) – 4:36 (Judas Priest cover)
"Moonage Daydream" (David Bowie) – 3:17 (David Bowie cover)
"Sunlit Nights" (Bruce Bouillet, Gilbert, Martin) – 4:04
"Give It to Me" – 3:07
"On the Loose" – 3:02
"Rock It" – 5:10
"Detroit Rock City" (Bob Ezrin, Paul Stanley) – 5:20 (Kiss cover)

Personnel
Racer X
Jeff Martin – vocals
Paul Gilbert – guitars
Bruce Bouillet – guitars
John Alderete – bass
Scott Travis – drums

Production
Ron Bloom, Andy Delena – producers, engineers
GGGarth – additional production with Racer X, mixing at Devonshire Studios, Hollywood
Stan Katayama, Jeff Demorris – mixing
Kenneth K. Lee Jr. – mastering
Mike Varney – executive producer

References

External links
 Official Racer X website

Racer X (band) albums
1992 live albums
Shrapnel Records albums